The Realm of Stefan Dragutin was a medieval Serbian kingdom. Initially, it was a vassal kingdom of the Kingdom of Hungary, but subsequently became an independent kingdom, after the collapse of the central power in the Kingdom of Hungary. It was ruled by the Serbian kings Stefan Dragutin (1282–1316) and his son Stefan Vladislav II (1316–1325). The kingdom was centered in the region of Lower Syrmia (today known as Mačva) and its first capital was Debrc (between Belgrade and Šabac), while residence of the king was later moved to Belgrade.

Territory

 
In the Middle Ages, "Syrmia" was the name for a larger area around the river Sava. The part in the north of Sava was known as Upper Syrmia (present-day Syrmia), while the area south of the river was known as Lower Syrmia (present-day Mačva). The kingdom was centered in Mačva, but also included Belgrade, part of Šumadija with Rudnik, and the župas (counties) of Podrinje, Usora, Soli, Braničevo and Kučevo. According to several Serbian historians (Dejan Mikavica, Stanoje Stanojević, Aleksa Ivić, Milojko Brusin, etc.), the kingdom also included Upper Syrmia (modern Syrmia).

History
Stefan Dragutin was initially the king of Serbia from 1276 to 1282. In 1282, he broke his leg while hunting and became ill; he passed the throne to his younger brother Stefan Milutin at the council at Deževo in 1282, while keeping for himself some northern parts of the country (Rudnik and parts of the župa of Podrinje). Since his son Vladislav married a relative of the Hungarian king, Dragutin in 1284 gained from Ladislaus IV the banates of Só (Soli), Ózora (Usora) and Macsó (Mačva) with Belgrade. He first ruled them as a Hungarian vassal, until the collapse of the central power of the Hungarian Kingdom. The first capital of his state was Debrc, and later he moved his residence to Belgrade. Dragutin was the first Serbian ruler to use Belgrade as his capital.

Around 1291 and with the help of Milutin, Dragutin expanded his territory by annexing the regions of Braničevo and Kučevo, whose former rulers Darman and Kudelin had recently become independent from the Kingdom of Hungary. For the first time, these regions became part of the Serbian state. This action probably caused the war between the Bulgarian despot Shishman of Vidin and Milutin.

Towards the end of his life, Stefan Dragutin broke away from his Hungarian allies and strengthened his ties with Serbia. He later took monastic vows, died in 1316 and was buried in the monastery of Đurđevi stupovi, near present-day Novi Pazar.

After the death of Dragutin, his son Vladislav assumed his father's appanage. However, in 1319, the Serbian king Milutin, Vladislav's uncle, invaded, defeated and imprisoned the latter. When Milutin died in 1321, the newly freed Vladislav recovered his father's lands, with the help of the Hungarians and of his nephew Stephen II, the ban of Bosnia.

After being defeated again by supporters of Milutin's son and successor, Stefan Dečanski, Vladislav retreated to the Kingdom of Hungary in 1324. Later, Stephen II reincorporated Soli and Usora into Bosnia. Belgrade and the northern part of the banate of Mačva along the river Sava remained under the rule of the Kingdom of Hungary, while Braničevo and the southern part of Mačva remained Serbian. The kingdoms of Serbia and Hungary would contest Mačva for the next century.

Rulers

Annotations

References

Sources

External links
Map of Dragutin's and Milutin's state, at the Serbian Government archive web site
Map of the realm of Stephan Dragutin, on a map of ''the crown of Aragon and the house of Anjou in the Middle Ages (up to ca. 1380)"
Map of the realm of Dragutin Istvan, on a map of "Hungarian oligarchs" 1301-1310
Map of "Tulso Szeremseg", on a map of the Kingdom of Hungary in the 13th century
 (from book "Hrvatska povijest u 25 karata", written by Stjepan Srkulj and Josip Lučić)

Former countries in the Balkans
Medieval Serbia
Mačva
History of Syrmia
Medieval history of Vojvodina
History of Belgrade
Banate of Bosnia
13th century in Serbia
14th century in Serbia
Kingdom of Serbia (medieval)
Nemanjić dynasty
Former kingdoms